Imilchil or Imilshil is a small town in Midelt Province of central Morocco, in the Atlas Mountains with a population of about 1,858.

It is located at an elevation of 2119 m in the valley of Asif Mellulen ("white river"). The area of Imilchil is home to the Ayt Hdiddu tribe, belonging to the Ait Yafelman confederation, and the inhabitants speak Central Atlas Tamazight. Tourist attractions in the area include the caves of Axyam (Akhyam), the Aguni waterfalls, the Ziz Gorges and Valley and the igherman castles (ksars) of the area.

Climate
Due to its altitude, Imilchil has a severe warm-summer continental mediterranean climate (Dsb), according to the Köppen system due to its below-freezing average temperature for the coldest month. Summers are hot and quite dry, with warm days and cool nights while winters are cold and snowy with below-freezing conditions, especially at night.

Marriage Festival
The town of Imilchil represents a symbol of Berber culture, known for its festival, officially known as Betrothal Festival - the Souk Aam or Agdoud N'Oulmghenni. The legend goes that two young people from different tribes fell in love, but were forbidden to see each other by their families. The grief led them to cry themselves to death, creating the neighbouring lakes of Isli (his) and Tislit (hers) near Imilchil. The families decided to establish a day on the anniversary of the lovers' death - when members of local tribes could marry each other. Thus the Imilchil Marriage Festival was born.

In reality, the region is a large scattering of tiny villages, and when young person needs to find a partner, they can't simply go and look for one, due to the conservative social norms. Thus, the festival allows for fathers to show their daughters and find husbands for them. When a woman accepts a man's proposal to marry, she says "You have captured my liver" (Tq massa n uchemt). Up to 40 couples take their vows on the same day. The festival is rich with music, dancing, feasts, and colorful clothing. The celebrations attracts many tourists to the area, and though contributing to local economy, there are fears that the rituals can be affected by the foreigners.

References

External links 
 A video of the "Festival de musique des cimes".
  IMILCHIL:September romance A look at the city and the festival.

Berber populated places
Berber words and phrases
Populated places in Midelt Province
Mountain villages in Morocco